Quinton Lenard Flowers (born December 2, 1994) is an American football quarterback for the Orlando Guardians of the XFL. He played college football at South Florida.

Early years
Flowers attended Miami Jackson High School in Miami, Florida. During his career he passed 6,042 yards and had 2,002 yards rushing with 32 touchdowns. He committed to the University of South Florida (USF) to play college football.

College career
As a true freshman at South Florida, Flowers played in five games and made one start. He finished the season with 111 passing yards and two interceptions and also had 73 yards rushing. 

Flowers was named the starting quarterback in 2015. He started all 13 games, completing 163 of 276 passes for 2,296 yards with a school record 22 passing touchdowns and eight interceptions. He also rushed for 991 yards and 12 touchdowns. Flowers returned as the starter in 2016. 

Flowers was the American Athletic Conference Offensive Player of the Year in 2016, rushing for 1,530 yards and 18 touchdowns, while throwing for 2,812 yards and 24 touchdowns with only 7 interceptions. Flowers was second nationally in ESPN's Total QBR statistic in 2016.

In 2022, Flowers was inducted into the University of South Florida Athletic Hall of Fame.

College statistics

Professional career

Cincinnati Bengals
Flowers was signed by the Cincinnati Bengals as an undrafted free agent on May 11, 2018 as a running back. He was waived on September 1, 2018 and was signed to the practice squad the next day. He was promoted to the active roster on December 28, 2018.

Flowers was waived during final roster cuts on August 31, 2019.

Indianapolis Colts
On September 1, 2019, Flowers was signed to the Indianapolis Colts practice squad, but was released six days later.

Tampa Bay Vipers
Flowers was drafted in the fifth round of phase one of the 2020 XFL Draft by the Tampa Bay Vipers; although he was drafted as a running back, head coach Marc Trestman affirmed his intention to also play Flowers at quarterback. 

Flowers left the team for personal reasons on February 26, 2020. He returned to the team on March 3, 2020, and requested to be traded. He had his contract terminated when the league suspended operations on April 10, 2020.

TSL Jousters
Flowers was selected by the Jousters of The Spring League during its player selection draft on October 12, 2020, but did not play with the league.

FCF Beasts
Flowers signed to play for the new Fan Controlled Football league for the 2021 season on January 12, 2021. 

Flowers appeared in his debut for the Beasts in Week 1 of the 2021 season, throwing for a touchdown on his first play and scrambling for two further touchdowns as the Beasts won 48–44, beating out the Zappers. In Week 2, Flowers was franchise tagged by the Beasts and played against the Wild Aces though a majority of snaps were given to the Beasts, QB2 TJ Edwards. Flowers once again threw for a touchdown on the first Beasts play of the game and rushed for two more touchdowns as the Beasts went on to win the game 30–28. Flowers then in Week 3, led the Beasts to a 3–0 record against the Glacier Boyz, throwing a touchdown to recently-franchise tagged Troy Evans on the Beasts opening drive and rushing for a touchdown on the following drive. The Beasts, then trailing late in the second half with thirty seconds on the clock, were able to tie the game with a passing touchdown from Flowers to Salisbury, winning soon after with a successful onside conversion. The Beasts lost their first game in Week 4, the last game of the regular season, where Flowers threw for one touchdown. Finishing the regular season as the total, rushing and passing touchdowns leader.

Orlando Guardians
On March 6, 2023, Flowers signed with the Orlando Guardians of the XFL in replace of Quinten Dormady who was under league investigation. He joined a quarterback room containing former Denver Broncos first-round pick Paxton Lynch and another former FCF player in Deondre Francois.

Professional statistics

XFL

Regular season

FCF

Regular season

Postseason

Personal life
Flowers' father died in a drive-by shooting when Quinton was seven years old and his mother died of cancer in 2012. Just days prior to his first college career start in 2014, his stepbrother was shot and killed. Flowers has admitted that he considered taking his own life in 2016, after an aunt died. He has a wife, and one daughter.

References

External links
South Florida Bulls bio

1994 births
Living people
Miami Jackson Senior High School alumni
Players of American football from Miami
American football quarterbacks
American football running backs
South Florida Bulls football players
Cincinnati Bengals players
Indianapolis Colts players
Tampa Bay Vipers players
Fan Controlled Football players
Orlando Guardians players